Ion (Ioan) Petrovici (June 14, 1882 – February 17, 1972) was a  Romanian professor of philosophy at the University of Iași and titular member of the Romanian Academy. He served as Minister of National Education in the Goga cabinet and Minister of Culture and Religious Affairs in the Third Antonescu cabinet.

Biography

Education
Petrovici was born in 1882, in Tecuci, the son of Dumitru and Ortansa Petrovici, and the grandchild of Junimist poet Theodor Șerbănescu's sister. Between 1892 and 1899 he attended secondary school at Saint Sava College in Bucharest. He enrolled at the Faculty of Letters and Philosophy of the University of Bucharest in autumn 1899, having Titu Maiorescu and Nicolae Iorga as teachers. He proposed his rhymed play O sărutare to the National Theatre of Bucharest during the same autumn. As Ion Luca Caragiale commended it, the play was performed on 21 March 1900. (He later became a board member of the National Theatre.) As a member of a student delegation representing the University of Bucharest, Petrovici participated in the commemoration of the 400th anniversary of Stephen the Great's death, which took place in the then Austrian town of Suceava in summer 1904. He graduated in philosophy in 1904, with the dissertation O problemă de filosofie (A Philosophy Problem), and became the first home-grown Romanian Doctor of Philosophy in June 1905, with the PhD thesis Paralelismul psiho-fizic (Psychological-physical Parallelism).

Academic career
He was appointed lecturer at the Philosophy Department of the University of Iași in November 1906 and professor in 1912.  He served as Dean of the Faculty of Letters and Philosophy in Iași between 1923 and 1926. He was a visiting professor at the University of Paris and the Académie des Sciences Morales et Politiques in Paris at the end of January 1932, where he lectured on La Nationalité en Philosophie and L'Idée de néant. He collaborated with André Lalande and Paul Gaultier. He was elected corresponding member of the Romanian Academy in 1927 and titular member in 1934; his acceptance speech, delivered on 28 May 1935, was on "Alexandru Philippide and the evolution of Romanian culture".

He contributed to philosophy with his research in Logic regarding the theory of notions and with his metaphysical conception, which connects faith to reason. Petrovici was an internationally known philosopher during interwar period. He contributed to prestigious philosophy journals in France and Germany and chaired international congresses.

Political career
As a member of Octavian Goga's anti-Semitic government (December 1937–February 1938), Petrovici planned to restrict the access of Jewish students to universities (the so-called numerus clausus) and decided that Romanian language, history, and geography teachers be only ethnic Romanians. From December 1941 to August 1944 he served as Minister of Culture and Religious Affairs in Ion Antonescu's government, organizing an intergovernmental agency that coordinated the deportation of Jewish converts.

Later years

He was arrested in 1948 following the advent of the Communist regime and sentenced to 10 years of hard labour for his participation in the Antonescu government. After serving his sentence at Aiud and Râmnicu Sărat prisons, he was deported to the Bărăgan in 1958. Petrovici died in Bucharest in 1972 and was buried in the city's Bellu Cemetery. A street in Tecuci and a school in Cosmești, Galați are named after him.

On October 26, 1998, the High Court of Cassation and Justice rejected the request to extend the annulment appeal, made by the Chief Prosecutor, Sorin Moisescu, in favor of Petrovici and several other member of the Antonescu cabinet who had been sentenced to between two and ten years of hard prison under the charges of war crimes, subordinating the national economy to fascism, and high treason.

Selected writings

Philosophical writings (in Romanian)

 Paralelismul psiho-fizic (Psychological-physical Parallelism, 1905)
 Rolul și însemnătatea filosofiei (The Purpose and Importance of Philosophy, 1907)
 Teoria noțiunilor. Studii de logică (Theory of Notions. Studies in Logics, 1910)
 Introducere în metafizică (Introduction to Metaphysics, 1924)
 
 Studii istorico-filosofice (Historical-philosophical Studies, 1925)
 
 
 Scrieri istorico-filosofice (Historical-philosophical Writings, 1943)
 Petrovici, I. (1931). Titu Maiorescu 1840–1917 . București, Romania: Tiparul Ion C. Văcărescu, Strada Umbrei, 4.
 Petrovici, I. (1940). La Centenarul lui Titu Maiorescu (At The Centennial of Titu Maiorescu). In Academia Româna, Memoriile Sectiei Literare, seria III, Tomul IX, Mem II. Monitorul Oficial și Imprimeriile Statului. București, Romania: Imprimeria Națională.
 Petrovici, I. (1966). De-a lungul unei vieți (Over a lifetime). București, Romania: Editura pentru Literatură.
 Petrovici, I. (1966). Kant. Viața și opera (Kant. Life and work). București, Romania: Eurosong-Book.
 Petrovici, I. (1997). Schopenhauer. Monografie istorico-filozofică (Schopenhauer. Historico-philosophical monograph). București, Romania: Eurosong-Book.

Philosophical writings (in other languages)
 Kant und das rumänische Denken (1927)
 La nationalité en philosophie (1932)
 Réflexions sur l'inconséquence (1934)
 La connaissance humaine et le transcendent (1937)
 La philosophie du compromis (1937)

Literary writings
 Raite prin țară (Wandering through the Country, 1926)
 Impresii din Italia (Impressions of Italy, 1930)
 Deasupra zbuciumului (Above Distress, 1932)
 Rotocoale de lumină (Circles of Light, 1934)
 Figuri dispărute (Missing Shapes, 1937)
  (posthumous)
 Însemnări de drum (Travel Notes, 1983, posthumous)

Bibliography

Ianoși, Ion (1996). O Istorie a Filosofiei Românesti (A History of Romanian Philosophy) (pp. 127–128). Cluj–Napoca, Romania: Editura Apostrof

Notes

1882 births
1972 deaths
People from Tecuci
Saint Sava National College alumni
University of Bucharest alumni
Conservative-Democratic Party politicians
People's Party (interwar Romania) politicians
National Agrarian Party politicians
National Christian Party politicians
Romanian Ministers of Culture
Romanian Ministers of Education
Romanian logicians
Romanian essayists
Romanian memoirists
20th-century essayists
20th-century memoirists
20th-century Romanian philosophers
Academic staff of Alexandru Ioan Cuza University
Titular members of the Romanian Academy
Members of the Romanian Academy of Sciences
Prisoners and detainees of Romania
Inmates of Râmnicu Sărat prison
Inmates of Aiud prison
Burials at Bellu Cemetery